The Opel Speedster is a mid-engined, targa-topped, two-seat sports car sold by German automaker Opel and introduced in July 2000. It was built in both RHD and LHD versions at the Lotus Cars plant in Hethel, Norfolk, England. It was presented at the Geneva Motor Show in March 1999 and went into full production the following year.

It was sold by Vauxhall as the VX220 in the United Kingdom and shared much in common with the Lotus Elise, although Opel claimed few parts were interchangeable.

Design and development

Due to changes in European crash safety regulations for the 2000 model year, Lotus needed to replace the original Elise. In October 1999, a deal was made between Lotus and General Motors in order for the former to gain sufficient funds to develop a new Elise. As part of the deal, Lotus agreed to develop and produce the Opel Speedster and Vauxhall VX220 on its new Series 2 Elise chassis. The first Speedster concept car was shown at the 1999 Geneva Motor Show.

Whilst the new Elise would use a  Toyota ZZ engine, similar to that found in the Toyota Celica, the Speedster was designed to use a  GM Ecotec engine from the Opel Astra. Neither engine had been used in the original Elise, which was fitted with a 1.8-litre Rover K-Series engine.

In order to accommodate the production of the new cars, Lotus expanded its Hethel factory to a capacity of 10,000 cars, with around 3,500 slots allocated towards the Speedster. Production of the Speedster commenced in March 2001.

The Speedster utilized an aluminium frame that weighed only , and bodywork made entirely of fibreglass. The Speedster's all-aluminium alloy 2.2 L Z22SE engine produced , making the Speedster considerably more powerful than the Series 2 Elise was at launch.

Production

In 2004, a limited run of sixty track-focused Speedsters were produced for the United Kingdom. The Vauxhall VXR220 was equipped with larger brakes, upgraded tyres and lowered suspension, and tuned to produce . Other features included further performance-oriented seats and unique Speedline alloy wheels. The wheels were 16 inches at the front and 17 inches at the rear, the same as on the Elise. Calypso Red was the only available exterior colour.

In 2005, General Motors introduced a Daewoo badged Vauxhall VX220 at Incheon International Airport in South Korea at the GM Daewoo showroom. However, only one was built for marketing purposes while the car was sold as an Opel Speedster.

In April 2001, comedian Griff Rhys Jones was dismissed by Vauxhall following an advert for the VX220 the previous year that drew negative attention, with Vauxhall stating that they wanted to move in a different direction. The advert was also voted “Worst of the Year” by an industry magazine.

Production ended on 22 July 2005, after five years, with no direct successor. It was not until February 2007, when GM Europe adopted the Pontiac Solstice/Saturn Sky into the Opel GT, that GM Europe had a replacement sector product, albeit with no RHD version for the United Kingdom. The final production number of the Speedster was only 7,207.

Opel ECO Speedster

The Opel ECO Speedster is a concept car made by Opel in 2002. Related to the production Opel Speedster, it is a two-door coupe with two seats, gullwing doors, and no wing mirrors. It was displayed at the 2002 Paris Motor Show

References

External links

Opel Eco-Speedster Article

Speedster
ECO Speedster
Rear mid-engine, rear-wheel-drive vehicles
Sports cars
Roadsters
Coupés
Cars of England
Cars introduced in 2000
Cars discontinued in 2005
Cars powered by transverse 4-cylinder engines